The 2019–20 New Mexico Lobos men's basketball team represented the University of New Mexico during the 2019–20 NCAA Division I men's basketball season. The Lobos were led by third-year head coach Paul Weir. They played their home games at The Pit, formally known as Dreamstyle Arena, in Albuquerque, New Mexico as members of the Mountain West Conference. They finished the season 19–14, 7–11 in Mountain West play to finish in a tie for seventh place. They defeated San Jose State in the first round of the Mountain West tournament before losing in the quarterfinals to Utah State.

Previous season 
The Lobos finished 14–18, 7–11 in Mountain West play to finish in seventh place. In the Mountain West tournament, they defeated Wyoming in the first round before losing to Utah State.

Offseason

Departures

Incoming transfers

2019 recruiting class

2020 recruiting class

Roster 

Source

Schedule and results

|-
!colspan=9 style=| Regular season

|-

|-
!colspan=9 style=| Mountain West tournament

Source

References

New Mexico Lobos men's basketball seasons
New Mexico
New Mexico Lobos men's basketball
New Mexico Lobos men's basketball